Roger Smith is a UK biologist and founder of the Millennium Seed Bank Project. He was awarded an OBE in the 2000 New Year Honours List for services to the project.

Smith joined the Royal Botanic Gardens, Kew in 1974,
after graduating from Manchester University with a BSc in botany.

References

British biologists
Living people
Alumni of the University of Manchester
Royal Botanic Gardens, Kew
Officers of the Order of the British Empire
Place of birth missing (living people)
Year of birth missing (living people)